The Asiatic long-tailed climbing mouse (Vandeleuria oleracea) is a species of rodent found in South and Southeast Asia. It is known as ගස් මීයා by Sinhalese people.

It is known to spread the Ixodes tick-borne viral Kyasanur Forest Disease (KFD).

Description
Head and body length is 7–9 cm. Tail is 10–12 cm. Reddish brown upperparts grading on the sides to light yellowish brown. Underparts are light brownish white. Long tail is dark, and slender with no tuft at tip. Largish hind feet with nails instead of claws on the outer toes, which are opposable.

References

Further reading

Vandeleuria
Rats of Asia
Mammals of Southeast Asia
Mammals of Nepal
Rodents of India
Mammals of Sri Lanka
Mammals of Bangladesh
Mammals described in 1832